Associação Desportiva Os Limianos  (abbreviated as AD Os Limianos) is a Portuguese football club based in Ponte de Lima in the district of Viana do Castelo.

Background
AD Os Limianos currently plays in the Segunda Divisão Série Norte, the third tier of Portuguese football. The club was founded in 1953 and they play their home matches at the Campo do Cruzeiro in Ponte de Lima. The stadium is able to accommodate 2,500 spectators.

The club is affiliated to Associação de Futebol de Viana do Castelo and has competed in the AF Viana do Castelo Taça. The club has also entered the Taça de Portugal on many occasions.

Current squad

Season to season

Honours
Portuguese Third Division: 1993/94
AF Viana do Castelo Divisão de Honra: 1998/99, 2005/06, 2007/08
AF Viana do Castelo 1ª Divisão: 1984/85, 1991/92
AF Viana do Castelo Taça: 2007/08

Notable former managers
 Rogério Gonçalves

Footnotes

External links
Official website 

Football clubs in Portugal
Association football clubs established in 1953
1953 establishments in Portugal
Sport in Ponte de Lima